Disperatamente Giulia (also known as Julia Forever) is a 1989 Italian romance-drama mini series directed by Enrico Maria Salerno. Broadcast on Canale 5, it is based on the novel with the same name by Sveva Casati Modignani.

Cast

Tahnee Welch:  Giulia De Blasco
Fabio Testi: Ermes Corsini
Dalila Di Lazzaro: Marta Montini
Stéphane Ferrara: Leo Rovelli
Enrico Maria Salerno: Ubaldo Milkovič
Laura Antonelli: Carmen Milkovič
Eros Pagni: Vittorio De Blasco
Bekim Fehmiu: Old Armando Zani  
Marina Suma: Zaira
Corinne Cléry: Elena Dionisi
Nina Soldano: Diana 
Marina Berti: Silvia
Jean-Pierre Cassel 
Vanni Corbellini 
Sabrina Siani 
Françoise Fabian 
Valeria Valeri
Marisa Merlini
Riccardo Garrone

References

External links
 

1989 television films
1989 films
1980s Italian-language films
1989 romantic drama films
Films directed by Enrico Maria Salerno
Films based on Italian novels
Italian romantic drama films
1980s Italian films